Jaisha Orchatteri Puthiya Veetil (born 23 May 1983), commonly known as O. P. Jaisha, is an Indian track and field athlete from Kerala. She is the current national record holder in the marathon, a distinction she achieved by clocking 2:34:43 at the 2015 World Championships in Beijing. In the process she bettered her own mark of 2:37:29, set at the 2015 Mumbai Marathon. She is also a former national record holder in the 3000 metres steeplechase.

She is currently being supported by JSW Sport under the Sport Excellence Programme.

Career
An alumnus of Assumption College, Changanassery, Jaisha competes in the middle and the long distance events, including 1500 metres, 3000 metres, 3000 metres steeplechase, and 5000 metres. She won gold over 1500 metres and 3000 metres at the 1st Asian Indoor Games held at Bangkok in 2005. She was, however, unable to repeat her performance at the 2006 Asian Indoor Championships, held at Pattaya, as she won only a silver in the 1500 metres and a bronze in the 3000 metres.

She represented India at the 2006 Commonwealth Games held in Melbourne, Australia. Jaisha is also a bronze medalist in 5000 metres at the Doha Asiad.

Jaisha took up steeplechase only in 2008 when she clinched the National title at Madurai Inter-State championships. However, she broke the Indian national record in 3000 metres steeplechase with a time of 10:03.05 at the 50th National Inter-State Athletics Championships held in Patiala on 7 August 2010. She erased the previous mark of 10:09.56 set by Sudha Singh on 18 May 2010 in Kochi.

At the 2014 Asian Games held in Incheon, South Korea, Jaisha won the 1500 metres bronze with a time of 4:13.46.

The following year in 2015, she made her marathon debut at the Mumbai Marathon  and clinched first place in the Indian women's category (eighth overall), breaking a 19-year-old record in the process.

At the National Games, held early February in the year in Jaisha's home state of Kerala, the marathon runner easily beat out the rest of her competition and won the gold medal in the 5000m event.

In August 2015, Jaisha participated in the marathon at the World Championships in Beijing, where she finished 18th, one place ahead of compatriot Sudha Singh, among the 52 athletes who completed the race. Both Jaisha and Singh improved upon the former's national record time set earlier in the year at the Mumbai Marathon, and both also qualified for the 2016 Olympics by virtue of their showing.

On 22 August 2016, post her return from the 2016 Summer Olympics, Jaisha controversially alleged that she fainted at the finish line post her race as she was "not given" enough water and energy drinks in between the race, during the Women's marathon event.

Competition record

Awards 
After her feats in the 2014 Asian Games which saw Jaisha win a bronze medal and achieve a personal best record, Kerala Chief Minister Oomen Chandy announced a cash reward for 7.5 lakhs to be awarded to Jaisha.

See also 
 Official Facebook page of O.P.Jaisha

References

1983 births
Living people
Indian female middle-distance runners
Indian female steeplechase runners
Sportswomen from Kerala
People from Changanassery
Malayali people
Olympic athletes of India
Asian Games bronze medalists for India
Indian female marathon runners
21st-century Indian women
21st-century Indian people
Commonwealth Games competitors for India
Asian Games medalists in athletics (track and field)
Athletes (track and field) at the 2006 Asian Games
Athletes (track and field) at the 2010 Asian Games
Athletes (track and field) at the 2014 Asian Games
Athletes (track and field) at the 2006 Commonwealth Games
Athletes (track and field) at the 2010 Commonwealth Games
World Athletics Championships athletes for India
Athletes (track and field) at the 2016 Summer Olympics
Medalists at the 2006 Asian Games
Medalists at the 2014 Asian Games
Athletes from Kerala